George Galloway (born 16 August 1954) is a British politician, broadcaster, and writer who is currently leader of the Workers Party of Britain, serving since 2019. Between 1987 and 2010, and then between 2012 and 2015, Galloway was a Member of Parliament (MP) for four constituencies, first for the Labour Party and later for the Respect Party, the latter of which he joined in 2004 and led from 2013 until its dissolution in 2016.

Galloway was born in Dundee, Scotland. After becoming the youngest ever chair of the Scottish Labour Party in 1981, he was general secretary of the London-based charity War on Want from 1983 until his election as MP for Glasgow Hillhead (later Glasgow Kelvin) in the 1987 general election. In 2003, he was expelled from the Labour Party for bringing the party into disrepute over his prominent opposition to the Global War on Terror.  Having stated he was "prepared" to stand as an independent MP before "considering his position and consulting the [anti-war] movement", Galloway, as a response to being expelled after his 36-year membership in the party, stated "I will definitely defend my position in parliament. I am not leaving politics."

In 2004, Galloway became a member of the Respect Party, and then the party's leader by late 2013. Having decided not to seek re-election for Glasgow Kelvin, he stood for Respect in the 2005 general election for Bethnal Green and Bow, defeating the sitting Labour MP, Oona King. He served for one parliamentary term and did not contest the seat in the 2010 general election. He returned to the House of Commons for the 2012 Bradford West by-election, but lost his seat in the 2015 general election. He stood as the Respect candidate in the 2016 London mayoral election, finishing in seventh place with 1.4% of the vote. He stood as an independent candidate for Manchester Gorton in the 2017 general election and for West Bromwich East in the 2019 general election. Following the 2019 general election, he founded the Workers Party of Britain. He led All for Unity, a Scottish party that he founded to support British unionism in the face of rising support for Scottish independence and the Scottish National Party (SNP), into the 2021 Scottish Parliament election, where it captured 0.9% of the vote.

Galloway testified to the United States Senate in 2005 over alleged illicit payments from the United Nations' Oil for Food Program against Ba'athist Iraq. Among other international issues, Galloway has voiced his Anti-Zionism and supports the Palestinians in the Israeli–Palestinian conflict, and was also involved in the Viva Palestina aid convoys to the Gaza Strip. He opposes India's role in the Kashmir conflict with Pakistan, and has voiced support for the insurgency in Indian-administered Kashmir. He supported Jeremy Corbyn in the 2015 Labour Party leadership election and during Corbyn's leadership of the party. In the 2016 EU membership referendum, he advocated a "Leave" vote, campaigning with the cross-party, pro-Brexit organisation Grassroots Out, while before the 2019 European Parliament election he announced on Twitter, "for one-time only", he would support Nigel Farage's Brexit Party.

Since 2006, Galloway has hosted the talk radio show The Mother of All Talk Shows.

Early life and career

Background and education
Galloway was born in Dundee, Scotland. His father, George Galloway Sr., was a Scottish trade unionist, while his mother, Sheila O'Reilly, was of Irish descent. Initially raised in Lochee, Dundee, he has described himself as "born in an attic in a slum tenement in the Irish quarter of Dundee, which is known as Tipperary." His father began as an electrician, before becoming an electro-mechanical engineer at NCR. After being made redundant, he retrained as a teacher. His mother was a cleaner, and then a factory worker. According to Galloway, his father was patriotic, while his mother had Irish nationalist sympathies, and was critical of perceived British pretensions in the world. He took his mother's side in arguments, and has been a long-time supporter of Sinn Féin and Irish reunification. David Morley, his biographer, has written that people who knew both father and son have said that they shared similar Marxist opinions, common in the local Labour movement of the time.

He grew up in Charleston, Dundee and attended Charleston Primary and then Harris Academy, a non-denominational school, playing for the school football team as well as for West End United U12s, Lochee Boys Club U16s and St Columba's U18s. According to Galloway, he grew a moustache at the age of 15, and refused to shave it off when his headmaster objected. He decided, at the age of 18, never to drink alcohol; the reason was originally derived from comments by his father, and he has described alcohol as having a "very deleterious effect on people".

Labour Party organiser
Galloway joined the Labour Party Young Socialists aged just 13 (although he said he was 15) and was still a teenager when he became secretary of the Dundee Labour Party.

Galloway became vice-chairman of the Labour Party in the City of Dundee and a member of the Scottish Executive Committee in 1975. On 5 May 1977, he contested his first election campaign in the Scottish district elections, but failed to hold the safe Labour Gillburn ward in Dundee being defeated by the independent Bunty Turley. He became the secretary organiser of the Dundee Labour Party in 1977 and at 26 was the youngest ever chairman of the Scottish Labour Party in March 1981, a post he held for a year after holding the vice-chairman post over the previous year.

After a trip to Beirut, Lebanon during 1977, Galloway became a supporter of Palestine, stating during his libel case against The Daily Telegraph in 2004 that "barely a week after my return I made a pledge, in the Tavern Bar in Dundee's Hawkhill District, to devote the rest of my life to the Palestinian and Arab cause." He supported Dundee City Council when it flew the Palestinian flag over the City Chambers building, and was involved in the twinning of Dundee with the Palestinian West Bank town of Nablus (Shechem) in 1980.

In late 1981, Galloway was interviewed for the Scottish Marxist in which Galloway supported the affiliation of the Communist Party of Great Britain (CPGB) to the Labour Party, in the same way as the Fabian Society does. Believing that a deficiency in political theory was being filled by the entryist infiltration of the party by the Trotskyists (such as the Militant group), he thought the problem was better resolved by communist thinking from members of the CPGB. (He was later opposed to the expulsion of members of Militant.)

In response, Denis Healey, Deputy Leader of the Labour Party, tried and failed to remove Galloway from the list of Prospective Parliamentary Candidates. Healey lost his motion by 13 votes to five. Galloway once quipped that, to overcome a £1.5 million deficit which had arisen in Dundee's city budget, he, Ernie Ross, and leading councillors should be placed in the stocks in the city square: "we would allow people to throw buckets of water over us at 20p a time."

In 1983, Galloway attempted to stand for the safe Labour seat of Rhondda after the Welsh Transport and General Workers' Union and the National Union of Miners had both nominated him to succeed Alec Jones, who had died. He hoped to be selected in the newly created seat of Dunfermline East where no incumbent was standing. Galloway failed to be selected for either seat, with Rhondda selecting Allan Rogers and Dunfermline East selecting future Chancellor of the Exchequer and later Prime Minister, Gordon Brown.

Standing as a candidate for a place on the Labour Party National Executive Committee in 1986, in a large field of 18 candidates, Galloway finished in 16th place.

War on Want
From November 1983 to 1987, Galloway was the general secretary of War on Want, a British charity campaigning against poverty worldwide. In this post he travelled widely, and wrote eye-witness accounts of the famine in Eritrea in 1985 which were published in The Sunday Times and The Spectator. His deputy at the charity, Simon Stocker, recalled: "If you went into a fight with George, you knew you would never walk out with a win."

On 28 October 1986, the Daily Mirror, in a front-page story by Alastair Campbell, claimed Galloway had spent £20,000 in expenses and had been "enjoying a life of luxury." An internal investigation, and later, an independent auditor, both cleared him of the accusation of any misuse of funds, although he did repay £1,720 in contested expenses. The official history of War on Want comments about Galloway that "even though the problems were not all of his own making, his way of dealing with them heightened tensions".

Political career (1987–2005)

Member of Parliament for a Glasgow seat
At the 1987 general election, Galloway was elected as the MP for Glasgow Hillhead gaining the seat for Labour from the SDP defeating Roy Jenkins with a majority of 3,251 votes. Although known for his left-wing political views, Galloway was never a member of the Campaign Group.

In a 2002 The Guardian interview, Galloway said he had supported the Soviet Union and said that its end was "the biggest catastrophe of my life". He told Robert Chalmers of The Independent on Sunday in June 2012: "I am not a pacifist. I am a revolutionary. I am a Socialist who doesn't like Capitalism and who likes Imperialism less. I am a revolutionary and I support the armed struggle where there is no alternative."

At a press gathering for War on Want in September 1987, when Galloway had stood down as general secretary of the organisation, a journalist asked him about his personal arrangements during the previous year's War on Want conference on the Greek island of Mykonos. The new MP replied: "I travelled and spent lots of time with people in Greece, many of whom were women, some of whom were known carnally to me. I actually had sexual intercourse with some of the people in Greece." By then separated from his first wife, Galloway made front-page headlines in the tabloid press at the time. Many years later, in a 2016 New Internationalist interview, he speculated that an incident of sexual abuse from a colonel, which he suffered when he was 12, has led to a "lifelong fear of being gay and this led me into ostentatious, rapacious heterosexual promiscuity".

In February 1988, the executive committee of his constituency Labour Party passed a vote of no confidence in him by 15 to 8. The constituency's general management committee voted 54-to-44 in favour of the motion a fortnight later on 22 February, although just three of the 25 members in the trade union section supported it. According to Tam Dalyell in 2003, the new Member of Parliament "was [the] only one MP that I can recollect making speeches about human rights in Iraq" in the House of Commons.

Galloway gained re-selection when challenged by Trish Godman (wife of fellow MP Norman Godman) in June 1989, but failed to get a majority of the electoral college on the first ballot. This was the worst result for any sitting Labour MP who was reselected, but Galloway gained 62% in total in the final vote. Galloway assured his party there would be a "summer of peace and reconciliation" in his acceptance speech, but this did not happen. Many members of the party who had supported Godman reportedly refused to work for Galloway in the next election, including Johann Lamont, who later became Leader of the Scottish Labour Party in 2011. The following August, 13 of the 26 members of the constituency party's executive committee resigned, including Lamont. According to her, Galloway "has done nothing to build bridges with the Members of the Executive [Committee of the Constituency Labour Party] who opposed his selection." She told a journalist from The Guardian: "The quarrel we have is all about accountability, and democracy... working in harmony, rather than any personal matters."

The Labour Party leadership election in 1992 saw Galloway voting for the eventually successful candidates, John Smith for leader and Margaret Beckett as deputy leader. In 1994, after Smith died, Galloway declined to cast a vote in the leadership election (one of only three MPs to do so). In a debate with the leader of the Scottish National Party, Alex Salmond, Galloway responded to one of Salmond's jibes against Labour by declaring "I don't give a fuck what Tony Blair thinks".

In 1997, Galloway's Glasgow Hillhead constituency was abolished and, although facing a challenge for the Labour nomination as the candidate for Glasgow Kelvin at the 1997 general election, Galloway defeated Shiona Waldron. He was unchallenged for the nomination for the 2001 general election. He was elected with majorities of 16,643 and 12,014 votes respectively. During the period he was Labour MP for Glasgow Kelvin, from 1997 to 2003, he voted against the whip 32 times, five votes out of 665 (0.8%) in the 1997–2001 parliament and the majority (27 votes out of 209 or 12.9%) in the period before he was expelled from the Labour Party. He was one of several politicians arrested in February 2001 during a protest at the Faslane nuclear base in Scotland, which led to him being convicted of a breach of the peace and fined £180.

Airing of Allegations against Mirror Group
In October 1991, Galloway signed a motion in the House of Commons expressing concern at the allegations against news publisher Mirror Group Newspapers put forward in Seymour Hersh's recently published book, The Samson Option: Israel's Nuclear Arsenal and American Foreign Policy. These were that the Daily Mirror's foreign editor, Nicholas Davies, was involved in weapons sales to Iran and had given the whereabouts of Mordechai Vanunu to Mossad, which sought his capture due to his role as a whistleblower of Israeli nuclear operations, and that Vanunu subsequently "was lured out of Britain to Italy, was kidnapped, drugged and returned to Israel". The motion also called upon Mirror Group's owner, Robert Maxwell, to appoint a tribunal to investigate the allegations and the potential involvement of foreign intelligence in the publishing group.  As the motion was signed under parliamentary priviledge, other news outlets could report on it without worrying about legal repurcussion, as Maxwell was known for litigiousness. Following this, the Daily Mirror published a front-page editorial against Galloway, accusing him of abusing parliamentary priviledge and of being motivated by links to anti-Israel terrorist groups. This led to Galloway being paid libel damages by Mirror Group.

Iraq from 1991

The first Gulf war
Galloway opposed the 1991 Gulf War and was critical of the effect that the subsequent sanctions had on the people of Iraq. In his book I'm Not the Only One (2004), Galloway expresses the opinion that Kuwait is "clearly a part of the greater Iraqi whole, stolen from the motherland by perfidious Albion", although Christopher Hitchens claimed the state existed before Iraq had a name. The massacre of Kurds and Shias just after the 1991 Gulf war, was according to Galloway, "a civil war that involved massive violence on both sides".

Writing for The Observer in April 2003, David Aaronovitch speculated that Galloway changed his opinion of Saddam Hussein under "the belief that my enemy's enemy is my friend. Or, in the context of the modern world, any anti-American will do. When Iraq stopped being a friend of the West it became a friend of George's."

Meeting with Saddam Hussein in 1994
In January 1994, Galloway faced some of his strongest criticism on his return from a Middle Eastern visit during which he had met Saddam Hussein. At his meeting with the Iraqi leader, he reported the support given to Saddam by the people of the Gaza Strip which he had just visited: "Sir, I salute your courage, your strength, your indefatigability... I can honestly tell you that there was not a single person to whom I told I was coming to Iraq and hoping to meet with yourself who did not wish me to convey their heartfelt, fraternal greetings and support." He ended his speech with the statement "Sir, I salute your courage, your strength, your indefatigability." He said that he was saluting the Iraqi people, rather than Saddam Hussein, in the speech, which meaning was accurately translated for the Iraqi leader.

As news of the incident reached the UK, Labour leader John Smith, in a statement, said: "I deeply deplore the foolish statement made in Iraq by Mr. George Galloway. In no way did he speak for the Labour Party and I wholly reject his comments." Shortly after his return, Galloway was given a "severe reprimand" by the Labour Chief Whip, Derek Foster, for his unauthorised trip to Iraq. The MP apologised for his conduct and undertook to follow future instruction from the whips.

For his visit with Saddam, Galloway was dubbed the "MP for Baghdad North". Galloway said, when he spoke before the U.S. Senate on 17 May 2005, that he had "met Saddam Hussein exactly the same number of times as Donald Rumsfeld met him." Whereas "Rumsfeld met him to sell him guns", Galloway had "met him to try to bring about an end to sanctions, suffering and war."

The Mariam Appeal
In 1998, Galloway founded the Mariam Appeal which was intended, according to its website's welcome page in 1999, "to campaign against sanctions on Iraq which are having disastrous effects on the ordinary people of Iraq". The campaign was named after Mariam Hamza, a child flown by the fund from Iraq to Britain to receive treatment for leukaemia. The intention was to raise awareness of the suffering and death of hundreds of thousands of other Iraqi children, due to poor health conditions and lack of suitable medicines and facilities, and to campaign for the lifting of the Iraq sanctions that many maintained were responsible for that situation. In 1999, Galloway was criticised for spending Christmas in Iraq with Tariq Aziz, who was Iraq's Deputy Prime Minister at the time. In a 17 May 2005 hearing of the United States Senate Committee on Homeland Security and Governmental Affairs Permanent Subcommittee on Investigations, Galloway stated that he had many meetings with Aziz, and characterised their relationship as friendly. In all, he has admitted to more than 10 meetings with Aziz.

During the 2003 invasion of Iraq, the fund received scrutiny after a complaint that Galloway used some donated money to pay for his travel expenses. He responded by stating that the expenses were incurred in his capacity as the appeal's chairman. Although the Mariam Appeal was never a registered charity and never intended to be such, it was investigated by the Charity Commission. The report of this year-long inquiry, published in June 2004, found that the Mariam Appeal was undertaking charitable work (and so ought to have registered with the commission), but did not substantiate allegations that any funds had been misused. It emerged some years later that Galloway had appealed in a letter dated 24 April 2003 to Lord Goldsmith, the Attorney-General, to stop the investigation into the Mariam Appeal. According to a report in The Times, after the letter was released under the Freedom of Information Act, Galloway falsely asserted that the appeal "received no money from Iraq".

A further Charity Commission Report published on 7 June 2007 found that the appeal had received funds from Fawaz Zureikat that originated from the Oil For Food programme, and concluded that:

Galloway, in response, stated: "I've always disputed the Commission's retrospective view that a campaign to win a change in national and international policy – a political campaign – was, in fact, a charity".

Iraq and Saddam Hussein
In a House of Commons debate on 6 March 2002, Foreign Office minister Ben Bradshaw said Galloway was "not just an apologist, but a mouthpiece, for the Iraqi regime over many years." Galloway called the minister a liar and refused to withdraw on the grounds that Bradshaw's claim was "a clear imputation of dishonour", and the sitting was suspended due to the dispute. Bradshaw later withdrew his allegation, and Galloway apologised for using unparliamentary language. In an article by Ewen MacAskill published by The Guardian in March 2000 about a visit by Galloway to Iraq and the Middle East, the politician describes himself as a supporter of the Iraqi people and the Ba'ath Party, but not Saddam Hussein himself.

In August 2002, Galloway returned to Iraq and met Saddam Hussein for a second and final time. According to Galloway, the intention of the trip was to persuade Saddam to re-admit Hans Blix, and the United Nations weapons inspectors into the country. 

Giving evidence in his libel case against The Daily Telegraph newspaper in 2004, Galloway testified that he regarded Saddam as a "bestial dictator" and would have welcomed his removal from power, but not by means of a military attack on Iraq. Galloway also pointed out that he was a prominent critic of Saddam Hussein's government in the 1980s, as well as of the role of Margaret Thatcher's government in supporting arms sales to Iraq during the Iran–Iraq War. In his memoir, I'm Not the Only One first published in 2004, he wrote that "just as Stalin industrialised the Soviet Union, so on a different scale Saddam plotted Iraq's own Great Leap Forward." He continued: "He managed to keep his country together until 1991. Indeed, he is likely to have been the leader in history who came closest to creating a truly Iraqi national identity, and he developed Iraq and the living, health, social and education standards of his own people."

In 2006 a video surfaced showing Galloway greeting Uday Hussein, Saddam's eldest son, with the title of "Excellency" at Uday's palace in 1999. Galloway is heard saying he will be with Uday "until the end". By his own account in I'm Not the Only One, Galloway advised members of Saddam Hussein's government about the ways to deal with a potential American invasion:

The Iraq war and Labour Party expulsion
Galloway became the vice-president of the Stop the War Coalition in 2001. Actively involved, he often delivered speeches from StWC platforms at anti-war demonstrations. After permission for a rally in Hyde Park during the international anti-war protests on 15 February 2003 was initially refused, Galloway said the government had a choice between "half a million people at the rally or half a million people in a riot".

Just over a month later, Galloway said in a 28 March 2003 interview with Abu Dhabi TV that Tony Blair and George W. Bush had "lied to the British Air Force and Navy, when they said the battle of Iraq would be very quick and easy. They attacked Iraq like wolves," and added that "the best thing British troops can do is to refuse to obey illegal orders". This incitement for "British troops to defy orders" was later among the formal reasons for his expulsion from the Labour Party.

On 18 April 2003, The Sun published an interview with Tony Blair who said: "His comments were disgraceful and wrong. The National Executive will deal with it". At this time, Labour MP Tam Dalyell commented in Galloway's defence: "I think he is a deeply serious, committed politician and a man of great sincerity about the causes he takes up." On 6 May 2003, David Triesman, then general secretary of the Labour Party, suspended Galloway from holding office in the party pending a hearing on charges that he had violated the party's constitution by "bringing the Labour Party into disrepute through behaviour that is prejudicial or grossly detrimental to the Party." Speaking on BBC Radio, Galloway said he stood by every word of the Abu Dhabi interview.

The National Constitutional Committee, responsible for internal disciplinary matters, held a hearing on 22 October 2003, to consider the charges, taking evidence from Galloway himself, from other party witnesses, viewing media interviews, and hearing character testimony from former cabinet minister Tony Benn, among others. The following day, the committee decided in favour of four of the five charges accusing Galloway of "bringing the party into disrepute," and expelled Galloway from the Labour Party. A claim that, in a speech, he had congratulated a successful anti-war candidate from the Socialist Alliance in Preston was rejected.

According to Ian McCartney, Labour Party chairman at the time, Galloway was the only Labour MP who "incited foreign forces to rise up against British troops" in the Iraq War. Galloway said after the NCC had decided on his expulsion: "This was a politically motivated kangaroo court whose verdict had been written in advance in the best tradition of political show trials." He claimed at the time that other MPs who had opposed the war, such as Bob Marshall Andrews and Glenda Jackson, would be expelled in due course, but no other MP was expelled from the Labour Party for their statements about the Iraq war. After an article by Galloway was published in the Morning Star attacking the Labour Party, Tony Benn wrote in his diary in June 2004, quoting from the article, that if he had persuaded the NEC not to expel him, Galloway would have remained "a member of a party currently run by a 'blood-splattered, lying, crooked group of war criminals'. It put me off George Galloway in a fairly fundamental way".

In 2005, at the time of the Iraq War, Galloway called President George W. Bush the world's "biggest terrorist".

Iraq after Saddam Hussein
Galloway defended Iraqi insurgents targeting Western forces as "martyrs" during August 2005 in appearances on Middle Eastern television channels, calling Iraqis who were with the allies security forces "collaborators" and said it was "normal" for them to be the targets of suicide bombers. He said: "These poor Iraqis – ragged people, with their sandals, with their Kalashnikovs, with the lightest and most basic of weapons – are writing the names of their cities and towns in the stars, with 145 military operations every day, which has made the country ungovernable. We don't know who they are, we don't know their names, we never saw their faces, they don't put up photographs of their martyrs, we don't know the names of their leaders". Galloway was challenged by the BBC but denied making the "martyrs" comment.

Galloway continued to praise Tariq Aziz. In April 2005, on Al Jazeera during that year's general election campaign, he described Aziz as "an eminent diplomatic and intellectual person". In his opinion, Aziz was "a political prisoner" and advocated his release.

Oil for Food

Daily Telegraph libel case
On 22 April 2003, The Daily Telegraph published news articles and comment describing documents found by its reporter David Blair in the ruins of the Iraqi Foreign Ministry. The documents purported to be records of meetings between Galloway and Iraqi intelligence agents, and they stated that he had received £375,000 per year from the proceeds of the Oil-for-Food Programme. Galloway completely denied the claims and pointed to the nature of the discovery within an unguarded, bombed-out building as being questionable. He instigated legal action against the newspaper, which was heard in the High Court on 14 November 2004.

On 2 December, Justice David Eady ruled that the story had been "seriously defamatory", and that The Daily Telegraph was "obliged to compensate Mr Galloway... and to make an award for the purposes of restoring his reputation." Galloway was awarded damages of £150,000 plus, after a failed appeal in 2006, legal costs of about £2 million.

Both sides regarded the libel case as an important test of the Reynolds qualified-privilege defence. The Daily Telegraph did not attempt to claim justification (where the defendant seeks to prove the truth of the defamatory reports): "It has never been the Telegraph's case to suggest that the allegations contained in these documents are true". The newspaper argued that it acted responsibly as the allegations it reported were of sufficient public interest to outweigh the damage caused to Galloway's reputation. The trial judge did not accept this defence, noting that comments such as Galloway being guilty of "treason", "in Saddam's pay", and being "Saddam's little helper" caused him [the judge] to conclude that "the newspaper was not neutral but both embraced the allegations with relish and fervour and went on to embellish them"; additionally, the judge ruled, Galloway had not been given a fair or reasonable opportunity to make inquiries or meaningful comment upon the documents before they were published.

Other libel claims
The Christian Science Monitor also published a story on 25 April 2003, stating that it had documentary evidence that he had received "more than ten million dollars" from the Iraqi government. However, on 20 June 2003, the Monitor reported that its own investigation had concluded that the documents were sophisticated forgeries.

Galloway sued the Christian Science Monitor for libel. In March 2004, he accepted damages and a public apology from the Monitor.

In January 2004, a further set of allegations were made in the Iraqi newspaper Al-Mada. The newspaper claimed to have found documents in the Iraqi national oil corporation showing that Galloway received (through an intermediary) some of the profits arising from the sale of 19.5 million barrels (3,100,000 m3) of oil. Galloway said that money had been paid into the Mariam Appeal by Iraqi businessmen who had profited from the UN-run programme. He stated he had not benefited personally and that there was nothing illicit about the transaction:

It is hard to see what is dishonourable, let alone "illicit", about Arab nationalist businessmen donating some of the profits they made from legitimate UN-controlled business with Iraq to anti-sanctions campaigns, as opposed to, say, keeping their profits for themselves. It's equally difficult to understand why The Guardian should put seven of its finest journalists to work roping Tam Dalyell and Albert Reynolds into the rightwing witch-hunt against me, particularly on the basis of documents that may have been faked or doctored in the forgery capital of the world.

In May 2005, The Guardian reported that "despite all the investigations in the oil-for-food programme, no one has ever produced any evidence that Iraqi oil money ended up in Mr Galloway's pocket".

US Senate

Allegations
In May 2005, a United States Senate committee report accused Galloway along with former French minister Charles Pasqua of receiving the right to buy oil under the UN's Oil-for-Food programme. The report was issued by the US Senate Permanent Subcommittee on Investigations, chaired by Senator Norm Coleman, a Republican from Minnesota.

Coleman's committee said that Pasqua had received allocations worth  from 1999 to 2000, and Galloway received allocations worth  from 2000 to 2003. The allegations against Pasqua and Galloway, both outspoken opponents of U.N. sanctions against Iraq in the 1990s, have been made before, including in an October report by US arms inspector Charles Duelfer as well as in the various purported documents described earlier in this section.

Galloway countered the charges by accusing Coleman and other pro-war politicians of covering up the "theft of billions of dollars of Iraq's wealth... on your watch" that had occurred under a post-invasion Coalition Provisional Authority, committed by "Halliburton and other American corporations... with the connivance of your own government."

Senate hearing (17 May 2005)
On 17 May 2005, the committee held a hearing concerning specific allegations (of which Galloway was one part) relating to improprieties surrounding the Oil-for-Food programme. Attending Galloway's oral testimony and questioning him were two of the 13 committee members: the chair (Coleman) and the ranking Democrat (Carl Levin).

On arriving in the US, Galloway told Reuters, "I have no expectation of justice from a group of Christian fundamentalist and Zionist activists." He described Coleman as a "pro-war, neocon hawk and the lickspittle of George W. Bush," who, he said, sought vengeance against anyone who did not support the war in Iraq.

In his testimony, Galloway made the following statements in response to the allegations against him:

Senate report (October 2005)
A report by the then-majority Republican Party staff of the United States Senate Permanent Subcommittee on Investigations published in October 2005 stated that Galloway had "knowingly made false or misleading statements under oath". The report exhibits bank statements, which the authors claim show that $150,000 of proceeds from the Oil-for-Food programme had been paid to Galloway's wife Amineh Abu-Zayyad.

It also stated that Galloway (and the Mariam Appeal) received eight allocations of oil from the Iraqi government amounting to 23 million barrels from 1999 to 2003. The Mariam Appeal was also found to have improperly received $446,000 via the Oil-for-Food programme. Tariq Aziz was said to have told the investigators that oil had been allocated in the names of two of Galloway's representatives, Buhan Al-Chalabi and Fawaz Zureikat. Aziz had told the investigators: "These oil allocations were for the benefit of George Galloway and for Mariam's Appeal. The proceeds from the sale benefited the cause and Mr Galloway".

Galloway reiterated his denial of the charges and asked the US Senate committee to charge him with perjury so that he could confront the charges in court. He said the investigation was an attempt to divert attention from the "pack of lies" that led to the Iraq invasion in 2003. He claimed Coleman's motive was revenge over the embarrassment of his appearance before the committee in May.

Galloway also said the claim Aziz had told investigators he had benefited financially, via Zureikat, from the Oil for Food programme had been rejected by Aziz, via his French lawyers. A contemporary UN-supported report written by Paul Volcker, the former American Federal Reserve chairman, stated that eleven million barrels of oil had been reserved in Galloway's name. For Volcker's report, Aziz was interviewed, but his account on this occasion differed from the one he had given the Senate, a change they considered unconvincing.

Before and after the 2005 general election

Foundation of Respect
Galloway announced in December 2003 that he would not force a by-election and did not intend to contest the next general election in Glasgow. His Glasgow Kelvin seat was to be split between three constituencies for the next general election. In one of these, the new Glasgow Central constituency, Mohammad Sarwar, the first Muslim Labour MP, wanted to be selected as the candidate. Galloway chose not to challenge him, announcing this decision at the end of May 2004 in his Mail on Sunday column.

Galloway wrote in an article for The Guardian at the end of October 2003 that he would soon be part of a coalition consisting of the "red, green, anti-war, Muslim and other social constituencies radicalised by the war." In January 2004, it emerged that Galloway would be working with the Socialist Workers Party in England and Wales, and others, under the name Respect – The Unity Coalition, generally referred to simply as "Respect". In the opinion of Nick Cohen of The Observer it was an "alliance... between the Trotskyist far left and the Islamic far right."

After the 2004 European Parliamentary election results became known, in which Galloway stood in London, but did not gain a seat, he announced that he would stand in East London at the next general election. On 2 December, he confirmed that he was aiming to be nominated as the Respect Party candidate for Bethnal Green and Bow.

Election campaign

The ensuing electoral campaign in the seat proved to be a difficult one with heated exchanges between Galloway, Oona King (the incumbent Labour MP for Bethnal Green and Bow), and their respective supporters. Galloway and Respect threatened to sue King, whose mother is Jewish, if she repeated her assertion in the Evening Standard on 10 April 2005 which reported her as saying: "I have been told by several people that members of Respect have told Muslim voters "not to vote for me because I am Jewish"".

Galloway was asked at a hustings early in the campaign why he was standing against one of only two black female MPs to which he replied that King had "voted to kill a lot of women in the last few years. Many of them had much darker skins than her". Claiming to be the ghost of Old Labour, Galloway told The Sunday Times contributor A. A. Gill that "we’re here to haunt new Labour". Bethnal Green and Bow is "where Labour was founded. We’re giving birth to the Labour Party all over again".

Galloway said at a hustings event that the Labour Government had been pursuing a "war on Muslims" while King said her stance against Saddam Hussein had been "principled". Galloway received death threats from an offshoot of al-Muhajiroun (a banned extreme Islamist group). On 19 April, about 30 men forced Galloway's meeting with a tenants’ association to be abandoned after claiming he was a "false prophet" for encouraging Muslims to vote. Galloway was held by the group for about 20 minutes before the police arrived at the scene. All the major candidates united in condemning the threats and violence. Both the Labour and Respect candidates were given police protection.

On 5 May, Galloway gained the seat from the Labour Party with a narrow majority of 823 votes, and denounced the returning officer for alleged discrepancies in the electoral process. After the election result became known, Galloway's spokesman, Ron McKay, rejected claims that King had been racially abused during the campaign and said it was King who had brought up her Jewish background.

Result and subsequent developments
During the BBC's election night coverage, Jeremy Paxman asked Galloway about whether he was happy to have removed one of the few black women in parliament, He replied: "I don't believe that people get elected because of the colour of their skin. I believe that people get elected because of their record and because of their policies".

Oona King later told BBC Radio 4's Today programme that she found Paxman's line of questioning inappropriate. Galloway "shouldn't be barred from running against me because I'm a black woman.... I was not defined, or did not wish to be defined, by either my ethnicity or religious background".

It emerged in a Channel 4 Dispatches programme in 2010 that the Islamic Forum of Europe, which advocates sharia law, had been involved in campaigning for Galloway in the Bethnal Green constituency. In a secretly recorded speech at a dinner shortly after his election, Galloway said that the involvement of the IFE had played "the decisive role" in his win. Although the IFE itself denied the accusation, Galloway admitted in a statement that the allegation was true.

The Respect Party split in the autumn of 2007, with the Socialist Workers' Party and Galloway's wing of Respect blaming each other for what he described as a "car crash on the left". Galloway did not seek re-election in Bethnal Green and Bow at the 2010 general election, instead opting to stand in the neighbouring constituency of Poplar and Limehouse. He received 8,160 votes coming third after the Labour and Conservative candidates.

Celebrity Big Brother
In January 2006, Galloway appeared on the fourth series of the reality TV programme Celebrity Big Brother for nearly three weeks. During his time on the programme, he mimed licking imaginary milk, whilst pretending to be a cat, from the cupped hands of another housemate, actress Rula Lenska. He wrote later that his activities "were actually the same stunts that BBC presenters and celebs get up for Children in Need".

Galloway faced a claim at the time from Hilary Armstrong, Labour's Chief Whip, that he should "respect his constituents, not his ego". Ron McKay, his spokesman and friend, said of the imaginary milk incident: "I rather wish he hadn't been given that particularly silly task". It had been assumed, McKay said, that Galloway's comments about politics would not be cut. Just after his eviction, Galloway told presenter Davina McCall he was positive about having taken part, although when asked if he was "glad" to have participated, he said: "Not after I've seen those press cuttings."

Galloway wrote in a column for The Independent newspaper in November 2012 writing that his "antics on Big Brother" had "raised tens of thousands of pounds for the" Interpal charity and paid for an "extra caseworker in my constituency".

Other developments (2007–2011)

Suspension from the House of Commons (2007)
On 17 July 2007, following a four-year inquiry, the House of Commons Select Committee on Standards and Privileges published its sixth report. The Parliamentary Commissioner for Standards, in an addendum to the report, concluded that there was no evidence that Galloway gained any personal benefit from either the former Iraqi administration, or from the Oil-for-Food Programme, but admitted that some documents had been unavailable to him. However, the Committee concluded, in the main body of the report:

It found that Galloway's use of parliamentary resources to support his work on the Mariam Appeal "went beyond what was reasonable" and "we recommend that he apologise to the House, and be suspended from its service for a period of 18 actual sitting days."

Galloway's suspension was not intended to be immediate, and he was given the opportunity to defend himself in front of the committee members in the House of Commons on 23 July 2007. During the debate, Galloway repeatedly called into question the motives of the members of the Select Committee, in particular claiming that some of them were members of a political organisation named "Indict" and were persecuting him for speaking out against the Iraq War. Speaker Michael Martin warned Galloway that his accusations were not relevant to the matter at hand, but he rejected the warning and responded by saying that Martin would have to order him out of the house if he had any issue with the accusations. Martin therefore named Galloway, leading to the attending members voting to trigger his suspension from parliament that day rather than wait until after the summer recess as had been recommended.

Israel and Palestine (2005–2011)
In an interview with the American radio host and conspiracy theorist Alex Jones in September 2005, Galloway said: "This is the thing about Zionism. It has nothing to do with Jewishness. Some of the biggest Zionists in the world are not Jews. These people have used Jewish people.... They created the conditions in the Arab countries and in some European countries to stampede Jewish people out of the countries that they had been living in for many hundreds of years and stampede them into the Zionist state."

During an interview for Al Jazeera television on 17 November 2005, he said his election as MP earlier in the year was "despite all the efforts made by the British government, the Zionist movement and the newspapers and news media which are controlled by Zionism". In Trials of the Diaspora: A History of Anti-Semitism in England, Anthony Julius cites this interview as one example of Galloway pandering to the antisemitic prejudices of his audience. According to Julius, Galloway merely refers to the "right-wing press" in the British media, whereas he has the habit of adding the word "Zionist" when speaking on television in the Arab world. A few years later, in a May 2009 speech given at a meeting in Westminster, Galloway said: "I do not agree with the argument that there is a shadowy Jewish influence. Israel is doing what America wants it to do and to argue otherwise is to go down the dark tunnel of racist antisemitism".

At a 22 July 2006 demonstration (and later in a Socialist Worker op-ed), Galloway stated that "Hizbollah has never been a terrorist organisation. It is the legitimate national resistance movement of Lebanon", on the basis that they are, in his opinion, "freedom fighters". In addition: "I glorify the Hezbollah national resistance movement, and I glorify the leader of Hezbollah, Sayyed Hassan Nasrallah". In 2009, Galloway received a Palestinian passport from Hamas leader Ismail Haniya. Hamas is designated as a terrorist organisation by Israel, the European Union, and the US.

During the 2008–2009 Israel–Gaza conflict, also known as Operation Cast Lead, Galloway commented in his speech at an event in Trafalgar Square on 3 January 2009: "Today, the Palestinian people in Gaza are the new Warsaw Ghetto, and those who are murdering them are the equivalent of those who murdered the Jews in Warsaw in 1943". Jonathan Freedland in The Guardian thought "the effect of repeating, again and again, that Israel is a Nazi state" was, potentially, an incitement to attack Jews because the comparison with Nazis as "the embodiment of evil" implies that "the only appropriate response is hate". Sigrid Rausing in the New Statesman wrote: "The claim of moral equivalence is dangerous, not because it exaggerates the horror of Gaza (the reality of that bombardment was probably worse than we can really imagine), but because it minimises the horror of the Holocaust."

Viva Palestina aid convoys

In response to the 2008–09 Israel–Gaza conflict Galloway instigated the Viva Palestina aid convoy to the Gaza Strip in January 2009. "There is a kind of intifada among the youth. They are determined to act", he told Cole Moreton writing for The Independent, adding, "We say, 'Don't be lured by the siren voices of separatism and extremism – join with us and express your anger politically, in a way that will be peaceful, non-violent, and not cost you your life, but will not cost other people their lives either".

By mid-February, the organisation claimed to have raised over £1,000,000 for humanitarian aid in four weeks, although the Charity Commission later found the true figure to be £180,000. On 14 February 2009, Galloway and hundreds of volunteers launched the convoy comprising approximately 120 vehicles intended for use in the Strip, including a fire engine donated by the Fire Brigades Union (FBU), 12 ambulances, a boat and trucks full of medicines, tools, clothes, blankets and gifts for children. The 5,000-mile route passed through Belgium, France, Spain, Morocco, Algeria, Tunisia, Libya and Egypt.

The convoy arrived in Gaza on 9 March, accompanied by approximately 180 extra trucks of aid donated by Libya's Gaddafi Foundation. On 10 March 2009, Galloway announced at a press conference in Gaza City attended by several senior Hamas officials: "We are giving you now 100 vehicles and all of their contents, and we make no apology for what I am about to say. We are giving them to the elected government of Palestine", adding that he would personally donate three cars and £25,000 to Hamas organisation "Prime Minister" Ismail Haniya.

On 8 April 2009, Galloway joined Vietnam War veteran Ron Kovic to launch Viva Palestina US. A third Viva Palestina convoy began travelling at the end of 2009. On 8 January 2010, Galloway and his colleague Ron McKay were deported from Egypt immediately following their entry from Gaza. They had been attempting to help take about 200 aid trucks into the Gaza Strip. They were driven by the police to the airport and placed on a plane bound for London.

The Foreign Ministry of Egypt released a statement reading: "George Galloway is considered persona non grata and will not be allowed to enter into Egypt again". Shortly after his deportation, Galloway said, "It is a badge of honour to be deported by a dictatorship" and "I've been thrown out of better joints than that."

Viva Palestina was registered as a charity in April 2009 but, following its continued non-submission of accounts, ceased to be recognised as a charitable organisation in November 2013. It was taken over by the Charity Commission in October 2014, which appointed an accountant to oversee the group because of the concerns over its financial management.

Support for the Iranian government
Galloway has worked for the Iranian state-run satellite television channel, Press TV since 2008. During an event at the London School of Economics in March 2011, he said: "Because I don’t believe that the government of Iran is a dictatorship I have no problem about working for Press TV in London which is a British owned television station. I’m not responsible for the government of Ahmedinijad. I’m not responsible for the leadership of Press TV". Galloway also said: "There are many things wrong with Iran. One thing they do have is elections. They elected a president that you or I might not have voted for but I am in no doubt that Ahmadinejad won the presidential election" held in 2009. (See Television presenter below.)

On 13 March 2008, Galloway said on The Wright Stuff chat show that the executed boyfriend of gay Iranian asylum seeker Mehdi Kazemi was executed for "sex crimes" rather than for being gay. Galloway also stated on the show that the case of gay rights in Iran was being used by supporters of a war with Iran.

Scott Long, writing in The Guardian on 31 March, criticised Galloway's claim that "homosexuals are not executed in Iran, just rapists," pointing out that current law in the country stipulates that "Penetrative sex acts between men can bring death on the first conviction." Gay rights activist Peter Tatchell, writing in The Guardian on 26 March, wrote that Galloway's "passionate opposition to a war against Iran, which I share, seems to have clouded his judgement" and "his claim that lesbian and gay people are not at risk of execution in Iran is refuted by every reputable human rights organisation, including Amnesty International, Human Rights Watch, the International Gay and Lesbian Human Rights Commission and the International Lesbian and Gay Association".

In August 2010, on his Press TV programme The Real Deal, Galloway interviewed President Mahmoud Ahmadinejad, following Galloway's participation in a conference for expatriate Iranians whose expenses were paid by Iran's government. Concerning the case of Sakineh Mohammadi Ashtiani, an Iranian woman convicted of adultery and sentenced to stoning, which he described as "the so-called stoning case". Galloway said of Ashtiani's sentence during the interview: "Every so often an issue comes along which is seized upon by the enemies of Iran and it becomes a heavy problem and magnified...".

According to Martin Fletcher in The Times, Ahmadinejad gave "mendacious answers" which "went unchallenged by his obsequious interlocutor". Galloway told Ahmadinejad: "I have police protection in London from the Iranian opposition because of my support for your election campaign" in 2009. "I mention this so you know where I'm coming from."

Political career since 2012

Bradford West by-election, 2012

After the resignation of Labour MP Marsha Singh due to ill health, Galloway returned to parliament at the March 2012 Bradford West by-election in an unexpected landslide result, with Galloway calling it "the most sensational victory in British political history." His 36% swing, defeating the Labour candidate Imran Hussain, was amongst the largest in modern British political history. Jeremy Corbyn, then a backbench Labour MP, congratulated him in a tweet. Galloway described the result as a "Bradford spring" (after the Arab Spring) and said that it showed the "total rejection" by voters of the three leading political parties.

The election campaign was marked by controversy, in particular over the role of sectarianism, Baradari (clan) networks, and allegations about rivals' lack of "Islamic values"  Andrew Gilligan noted in The Daily Telegraph that Galloway had won in wards with a predominantly white electorate as well as those with a majority Muslim population. Nick Robinson, the BBC's political editor, believed it was "a one-off political coup by a political one-off" in a seat which has not followed national trends in the past. The novelist Howard Jacobson in The Independent wrote that Galloway's "campaign shamelessly courted Muslim prejudice in smaller matters such as alcohol – where Galloway painted himself as more Muslim than the Muslim Labour candidate whom he accused of liking, shock horror, a tipple." Patrick Cockburn in The Independent on Sunday commented: "It says something about the comatose nature of British politics that an effective critic of... failed wars like Mr Galloway, who beats an established party, should be instantly savaged as a self-serving demagogue."

In October 2013, the Total Politics magazine published an interview with Galloway in which he admitted: "I like elections more than I like serving", and said that he found being an MP was "2% terrifying, and 98% tedium."

In late 2013, Galloway became Leader of the Respect Party.

Julian Assange comments (August 2012)
Galloway was criticised for comments he made in August 2012 on the legal case involving Wikileaks' Julian Assange in a podcast released on YouTube. He stated that "I think that Julian Assange's personal sexual behaviour is something sordid, disgusting, and I condemn it." Swedish prosecutors wanted to question Assange in relation to the alleged sexual assault of two women, an accusation he has rejected.

Galloway continued by stating: "But even taken at its worst, if the allegations made by these two women were true, 100 per cent true, and even if a camera in the room captured them, they don't constitute rape, at least not rape as anyone with any sense can possibly recognise it." He also stated that "not everybody needs to be asked prior to each insertion." He continued by saying that the allegations, even if true, "don't constitute rape" because initiating sex with someone who is asleep after a sexual encounter the previous night is not rape (one of the women, he said, "woke up to him [Assange] having sex with her again – something which can happen, you know"). He said that Assange's alleged actions amounted to no more than "bad sexual etiquette", and he did not believe the women's story anyway.

According to British barrister Felicity Gerry, Galloway's description of rape is not correct under English law. Galloway's comments were criticised by anti-rape campaigners as "ignorant", "very unhelpful", "offensive" and "deeply concerning." Then-Respect Party leader Salma Yaqoob described Galloway's comments as "deeply disappointing and wrong." She subsequently resigned from her post and the party. Yaqoob later stated that having to choose between Galloway's "anti-imperialist stances" and standing up for the rights of women was "a false choice."

Galloway subsequently lost his job as a columnist for Holyrood, a Scottish political magazine, for refusing to apologise for his remarks, and subject to a No platform policy by the National Union of Students.

Israel and Zionism (2012–present)

Abruptly leaves meeting in Oxford, February 2013
On 20 February 2013, Galloway walked out of a publicised debate when he found out that his opponent had Israeli citizenship. The debate, hosted by Oxford University's Christ Church, was on the topic "Israel should withdraw immediately from the West Bank". Galloway interrupted his opponent, Eylon Aslan-Levy, a third-year PPE student, to ask whether he was an Israeli. When Aslan-Levy acknowledged his joint British-Israeli nationality, Galloway stood up and stated "I don't recognize Israel and I don't debate with Israelis" and left the meeting. Explaining his actions on his Facebook page, Galloway wrote:

Galloway later claimed on his Twitter feed that he had been "misled", writing that "Christ Church never informed us that the debate would be with an Israeli. Simple." The organiser, Mahmood Naji, denied Galloway's allegations in an open letter, explaining: "At no point during my email exchange with Mr Galloway's secretary was Eylon's nationality ever brought up or mentioned... nor do I expect to have to tell the speaker what his opponent's nationality is."

Galloway's behaviour was criticised by Julian Huppert, the Liberal Democrat MP for Cambridge, and The Times. The Palestinian Boycott, Divestment and Sanctions (BDS) National Committee subsequently released a statement indicating that, while it does support a "boycott of Israel", the campaign rejects boycotting an individual "because she or he happens to be Israeli or because they express certain views."

In a debate at The Oxford Union the following October, Galloway compared the support of debating Israeli Zionists with that of supporting South African apartheid. Referring indirectly to his encounter with Aslan-Levy, Galloway said that he had worked with Jewish anti-apartheid activists in South Africa, adding "So Jews don't have to be on the side of apartheid". These remarks were criticised by Marc Goldberg, writing for The Times of Israel: "By identifying them as Jews, rather than by their chosen atheist ideology, Galloway makes it clear that the attempt by Jews to shed their Jewish skin and join the global brotherhood of the workers failed. Galloway is praising these people, but he is doing so by holding them up as examples of good Jews that other Jews should emulate, not as anti-apartheid campaigners that everyone should emulate."

"Israel-free zone" speech in Leeds, August 2014
On 2 August 2014, during the 2014 Israel–Gaza conflict, Galloway delivered a speech at a public meeting in Leeds. He said:

Galloway's remarks drew sharp criticism from British politicians and Jewish leaders. Conservative MP and pro-Israel campaigner Robert Halfon described Galloway's words as an "ill-considered rant that will cause great offence to many" while adding that "most Bradford citizens are like British people as a whole: tolerant and decent – and will ignore Mr Galloway’s demands, treating them with the contempt they deserve." Jonathan Arkush, then vice-president of the Board of Deputies of British Jews stated that Galloway "is so intolerant he can't bear to have someone with an opposing view in his town".

Daniel Taub, the Israeli ambassador to the UK, visited Bradford on 18 August in response to an invitation, where he met with local councillors, faith leaders and community representatives. In an interview, Taub commented that his visit was proof that "the people of Bradford [have] sent a clear message that George Galloway does not represent them." Galloway told a reporter from the BuzzFeed website: "As has just been proved, I cannot make Bradford an Israel-free zone, but I am certain that the Israeli ambassador was not welcome." Galloway accused the councillors who had invited the ambassador of fraternising with a "mouthpiece for murder".

West Yorkshire Police investigated two complaints to determine if Galloway's words constituted hate speech (British law prohibits discrimination based on nationality). Galloway was questioned under caution by the police and the matter was referred to the Crown Prosecution Service. Galloway subsequently criticised the police investigation, describing it as "an absolute and despicable attempt to curb my freedom of speech". In October 2014, it emerged that Galloway would not be prosecuted for his comments on the grounds of "insufficient evidence", although West Yorkshire Police had "recorded this matter as a hate incident."

On 29 August 2014, Galloway was assaulted in Notting Hill by Neil Masterson, a convert to Judaism, and suffered a bruised rib and severe bruising on his head and face. Masterson was charged with religiously aggravated assault and sentenced to 16 months in prison. Released from prison in September 2015, he soon returned to jail for a month after breaking a restraining order forbidding him from contacting Galloway. Masterson was also fined for harassment.

On 13 October 2014, Galloway abstained from a vote in the House of Commons formally recognising Palestine because the motion included the recognition of Israel as well. On the Respect website he advocated a one-state solution.

Alleged defamation
On 5 February 2015, Galloway appeared on BBC's Question Time discussion programme, recorded in Finchley, London, within a constituency with Britain's largest Jewish community. Galloway's appearance on this edition of the programme was the subject of much media coverage at the time because of his anti-Israel attitude. Part of the debate discussed antisemitism and Galloway strongly objected to the insinuation that he holds anti-semitic views. (In 2008, Galloway said "the slur" was "categorically crushed" after he won a libel action against the Jewish station Jcom Radio following the broadcast of a parody of him shouting "Kill the Jews, Kill the Jews".) Five days later, Hadley Freeman, a columnist for The Guardian, tweeted: "Galloway has said and done things that cross the line from anti-Israel to antisemitic".

Galloway said that he would issue a suit for defamation against her. Some who had re-tweeted Freeman's comment were then sent a letter from Chambers Solicitors, acting for Galloway, asking for an apology and £5,000 plus Value Added Tax (then levied at 20%) to cover costs incurred by the letter. The Solicitors Regulation Authority, which looks into professional malpractice, was aware of the issue by early March 2015. Eric Heinze, Professor of Law at Queen Mary University of London, noted that an editor of the Media Lens website had sent a tweet to Freeman asking if she could provide evidence for her claim that Galloway is antisemitic. Heinze wrote that "any example she could cite would probably persuade some and not others. Even if an overwhelming majority were unpersuaded, a highly popular opinion does not create an objectively verifiable fact." Chambers Solicitors' conduct was the subject of a warning from the SRA a year later. Initiating a libel action must begin within a year and no formal writ was issued.

2015 general election
During a hustings meeting in Galloway's Bradford West constituency on 8 April during the 2015 general election heated exchanges occurred between Galloway and the Labour candidate, Naz Shah. Galloway accused her of lying about her forced marriage which had been the subject of an open letter written by Shah and released to the media after her selection as a candidate. He said Shah was in error in claiming she was "subject to a forced marriage at the age of 15. But you were not 15. You were 16-and-a-half". He then produced what he said was her nikah, a Muslim marriage certificate.

Shah alleged at the event that Galloway's representative in Pakistan impersonated her deceased father to acquire the nikah. Ron McKay, Galloway's spokesman, said that there was no dishonesty in gaining access to the document via an intermediary in Pakistan. Labour supplied media outlets with a copy of Shah's nikah which confirms that she was 15 at the time of her forced marriage. By her own account, Shah was raped during the marriage, but in an email to Helen Pidd, The Guardians northern editor, McKay disputed whether it had been a forced marriage at all.

Galloway accused Shah of favouring Israel. At one point during the campaign, Galloway tweeted a picture of Israelis waving Israeli flags with the caption "Thank you for electing Naz Shah". The image was juxtaposed with another, showing Palestinians celebrating his own supposedly imminent victory. Shah said she has participated in marches supporting the Palestinian cause.

Galloway was defeated at the 2015 general election. Naz Shah won a majority of 11,420 votes over him, reversing the majority of 10,000 votes he had gained at the by-election three years earlier.

On 10 May 2015, Galloway announced an intention to challenge the result, alleging that false statements and malpractice related to postal votes during the campaign meant that the result of the election should be set aside, but did not do so. The Fawcett Society expressed concern that "the continued opposition of the unsuccessful Respect Party candidate George Galloway, to Shah's election is the culmination of a sexist electoral campaign by Galloway". In July 2015, Jeremy Corbyn said he thought "...the tactics he used against our candidate, were appalling. I was quite shocked; it was appalling."

It emerged in January 2017 that Galloway's reimbursed expense claim for the rent of his constituency office in Bradford West has been forwarded by the Independent Parliamentary Standards Authority (IPSA) to the Metropolitan Police, which was then at the early assessment stage.

London mayoral campaign (2015–16)
During his unsuccessful 2015 general election campaign to be re-elected for Bradford West, Galloway announced that he would stand in the election for London mayor in 2016 if he lost, an intention he confirmed on Twitter on 28 May.

Dave Hill, writing for The Guardian in November 2015, accused Galloway of making "cutting personal attacks" about the Labour candidate Sadiq Khan, a Muslim whom "Galloway... appears to consider... an inadequate practitioner of his faith" (a reference to Galloway's remark that Khan held the Quran in his left, not right, hand, and it "wasn’t missed by people who care about these things"). In the final result, Galloway came seventh with 37,007 (1.4%) first preference votes. After second preference were accounted for, Sadiq Khan became mayor of London.

Other developments (2015–present)

In July 2015, Galloway endorsed Jeremy Corbyn's campaign in the Labour Party leadership election. He tweeted: "Congratulations to Jeremy Corbyn MP and good fortune in the labour leadership contest. If he wins it will change everything..." He also said that he would become a Labour Party member "pretty damn quick" if Corbyn was elected as Labour leader. Less than a week after Corbyn became leader, a Labour spokeswoman told The Times: "George Galloway has not applied to rejoin the Labour party and he will not be receiving an invitation." Corbyn himself said in July 2015 during an interview with New Statesman editor Jason Cowley that he was appalled at the tactics Galloway used while defending his seat against Naz Shah (Labour) during the general election. In an interview to The Huffington Post journalist Paul Waugh in December 2015, Corbyn said that Galloway's readmission to the party was a decision not within his powers.

Following Ken Livingstone's much criticised comments in late April 2016 concerning Adolf Hitler and Zionism, Galloway supported Livingstone's argument. Galloway disputed that Livingstone's comments were antisemitic. "The Israel lobby has just destroyed the Labour Party", he tweeted in May 2016. "It is an amazing achievement".

In July 2016, Galloway endorsed Corbyn's campaign in the Labour Party leadership election. He said: "If Corbyn wins a big victory – and I think he will – then that should be, and it's important that it is, the final burial of Blair and Blairism."

The Respect Party "voluntarily deregistered" from the Electoral Commission on 18 August 2016.

It was announced on 21 March 2017 that Galloway was standing as an independent candidate at the Manchester Gorton by-election set for 4 May, following the death of Sir Gerald Kaufman in February. Gorton had been one of Labour's safest seats at the 2015 general election. The by-election was cancelled following the announcement of the 2017 snap general election being held on 8 June. Galloway subsequently transferred his candidacy to the general election. At the election, Labour easily retained the seat; Galloway came a distant third with 5.7% of the vote.

Meanwhile, on 20 June 2016, Galloway lost a libel action brought by Aisha Ali-Khan, his assistant for six months in 2012. He had claimed that she had pursued a "dirty tricks" campaign against him and the Respect Party, and had slept at his house with her then-husband. The case was heard in the High Court. His counsel apologised on Galloway's behalf, and accepted that he had made "defamatory accusations". Ali-Khan will receive a "five-figure sum" in damages and her legal costs. As part of the settlement of their libel claim, both Galloway and Ali-Khan gave undertakings not to make any further public statement about the litigation or to defame each other. In 2018 Galloway brought an action that Ali-Khan had breached this undertaking 26 times, which Ali-Khan admitted, and in April 2018 the High Court imprisoned Ali-Khan for 12 weeks for contempt of court, describing her action as "deliberate, flagrant, persistent and inexcusable". Ali-Khan had been found guilty of contempt of court on a previous occasion. Previously, during 2017, Ali-Khan had filed a petition for Galloway's bankruptcy.

In the 2019 general election, Galloway contested the Parliamentary seat of West Bromwich East as an independent, describing himself as supportive of Corbyn's leadership but also supportive of Brexit. He came 6th with 489 votes.

On 14 December, Galloway launched the Workers Party of Britain, which describes itself as "economically radical with an independent foreign policy" and "unequivocally committed to class politics". Galloway is the party's leader.

On 16 November 2020 Galloway announced his intention to stand in the expected by-election in Rutherglen and Hamilton West, after sitting MP Margaret Ferrier was accused of breaching COVID-19 regulations, for which she faces a possible recall petition.

He led All for Unity in the 2021 Scottish Parliament election and announced his intention to vote for the Conservative Party on the constituency vote, and for his own party on the list vote. This contradicted several other occasions in which he said voting Conservative was something he would never even consider. All for Unity received 23,299 votes in the election, or 0.9%, placing the party 7th nationally and giving them zero seats.

On 27 May 2021, Galloway announced his intention to stand for the 2021 Batley and Spen by-election. Galloway came third with 21.8% of the vote, and said he would challenge the outcome of the election in court, as he said lies were told about him during the election campaign.

Galloway received heavy criticism for his alleged apologism of Russian President Vladimir Putin in the run up to and during the 2022 Russian invasion of Ukraine. Galloway blamed the conflict on "the west" and stated on Twitter that the invasion was "not what I wanted" but placed the blame on the US and "pumping Ukraine full of NATO weapons". These and his party, the Workers Party of Britain's comments resulted in the anti Scottish independence Alliance 4 Unity party, led by Jamie Blackett ending the party's association with Galloway. Scottish Liberal Democrats leader, Alex Cole-Hamilton stated that Galloway's "association with RT has lent legitimacy and influence to the propaganda apparatus of a hostile power".

Due to his employment by RT, his Twitter account was labelled as "Russian state media" by Twitter. In response Galloway tweeted: "Dear @TwitterSupport I am not "Russian State Affiliated media". I work for NO #Russian media. I have 400,000 followers. I'm the leader of a British political party and spent nearly 30 years in the British parliament. If you do not remove this designation I will take legal action." After Twitter users pointed out that Galloway associated himself with Russian state media outlets in his profile, these associations were removed from his profile.

In mid-May 2022, George Galloway, who ran in neighbouring Batley and Spen in a 2021 by-election, posted a video saying that he might "put my own hat in the ring" and run in the 2022 Wakefield by-election for the Workers Party of Britain, while criticising Labour's candidate selection process. However, Galloway stated that he would prefer for a local candidate amongst the Labour ranks to stand.

Elections contested

UK Parliament elections

London mayoral elections

Scottish Parliament elections

Other domestic and international issues

Syria

Support for Bashar al-Assad
Galloway expressed support for the Syrian presence in Lebanon five months before it ended, telling the Lebanese Daily Star in August 2008: "Syrian troops in Lebanon maintain stability and protect the country from Israel". In the same article he expressed his opposition to United Nations Security Council Resolution 1559, which urged the Lebanese Government to establish control over all its territory. When Syria did withdraw from Lebanon, Galloway objected and said the neighbouring states presence had been entirely "legal"; Christopher Hitchens, citing the Taif Accords of 1989, disputed his comment.

Of Bashar al-Assad, and the country he leads, he said during a visit to the University of Damascus in November 2005: "For me he is the last Arab ruler, and Syria is the last Arab country. It is the fortress of the remaining dignity of the Arabs". He also called Assad a "breath of fresh air".

Galloway again praised the government of Assad in a leaked 2010 email to Assad's advisor Bouthaina Shaaban when asking for help in a Viva Palestina convoy and reminded her of previous help from the Syrian government for the campaign. In the correspondence, leaked by the Anonymous hacking group, she responded: "God bless your amazing efforts and I will be honoured to be part and parcel of it". "I knew that I could rely on you and the last Arab country in this historic endeavour", he wrote in response.

Galloway said in a July 2011 interview on Hezbollah's Al-Manar station: "Bashar Assad wants reform and change, to realise the aspirations of his people". In the early stages of the Civil War (when Assad was reported as "perpetrating massacres of his own people"), opponents were "trying to pressure Syria and President Assad because of the good things that he did, such as supporting Palestinian and Lebanese resistance and rejecting to surrender to Israel".

Syrian civil war (2011–present)
A month later, in an August 2011 piece for the Al Jazeera website, Galloway wrote he "was never close to the Syrian regime" and acknowledged its "authoritarian character, its police state mentality", and the "rampant" corruption "much of it concentrated around his [Assad's] own family". "I fully support the Syrian revolution", Galloway told Christopher Silvester in November 2012. "I want to see the end of all the dictatorships in the Middle East and I hope that it can be achieved peacefully. But if peaceful change is not possible, then violent change is inevitable. I wholly support the Syrian people's demands for democratic government. I just don't support armed intervention in Syria, any more than I supported it in any other country in the region".

In January 2013, Galloway criticised David Cameron's government for arming Syrian rebels linked to Salafi jihadism. Following the Ghouta chemical attack on 21 August 2013, Galloway speculated on his Press TV show that the responsibility for the atrocity lay with al-Qaeda and the rebels in Syria who had been provided with the weapons by Israel. During his speech in the House of Commons debate about the crisis in Syria on 29 August 2013, Galloway was asked about this broadcast by the Conservative MP Matthew Offord. In response, he stated that he had "said no such thing", and was accused of lying. In the debate Galloway had stated "It is not that the regime is not bad enough to do it; everybody knows that it is bad enough to do it. The question is: is it mad enough to do it?".

In a House of Commons debate on 26 September 2014 he opposed military action by the west against the Islamic State of Iraq and the Levant (ISIL) insurgency group, which he called a "death cult", and instead advocated military action from the regional powers.
Galloway told Prospect magazine in February 2016: "I support the decision of the Russian government to come to the aid of the government in Syria because whatever faults it [the Syrian government] may have, whatever crimes it has committed, they are considerably fewer than the crimes committed by IS or would be committed by IS were they to come to power".

Latin America
He has been an advocate for the Venezuelan government of Hugo Chávez and, in his Fidel Castro Handbook, for the former Cuban leader. "You were the greatest man I ever met Comandante Fidel", he tweeted when Castro died in November 2016.

Scotland and the UK
Galloway has long supported devolution for Scotland, but opposes Scottish independence. In the run-up to the Scottish independence referendum, held on 18 September 2014, Galloway was dismissive of the official Better Together campaign because it also involved Conservatives and Liberal Democrats, and he believed its leader, Alistair Darling, to be ineffective. "My case isn't that Scotland couldn't be independent, but shouldn't", The Sunday Times quoted him as saying.

Galloway's argument against independence was based on a defence of "class" over "nationality". He told Serena Kutchinsky in an interview for Prospect magazine: "If we lose this vote the possibility of a real Labour government, or any kind of Labour government, in the rest of UK will be gone". He has, however, argued in favour of greater Scottish devolution.

In 2013, Galloway began a series of public meetings in Scotland using the slogan of "Just Say Naw." On 11 September 2014, Galloway took part in Scotland Decides: The Big, Big Debate, an independence debate held in Glasgow and broadcast by the BBC during the evening.

In July 2020, Galloway co-founded and established a cross-party Scottish unionist political organisation and political coalition called Alliance 4 Unity (later re-named All for Unity), and its goal is to try of taking down the Scottish National Party and Scottish nationalism in general for the 2021 Scottish Parliament election, by tactical voting for any Scottish unionist candidates in second place on each Scottish electoral regions.

Saudi Arabia
Galloway has criticised Britain's close ties with Saudi Arabia and British involvement in the Saudi Arabian-led intervention in Yemen. In 2017, he said: "It is a country with no democracy or freedom of any kind. It is a country that exports terrorism around the world and funds terrorism and extremism around the world. We should have nothing whatsoever to do with them."

India 
Galloway said the Indian Prime Minister Narendra Modi "has blood on his hands". Modi was accused of initiating and condoning the 2002 Gujarat riots against India's Muslim minority.

European Union
At a rally at the Queen Elizabeth II Conference Centre on 19 February 2016, Galloway endorsed the Grassroots Out (GO) campaign which advocated the "Leave" option in the European Union membership referendum. He was introduced by UKIP leader Nigel Farage as a "special guest" who is "without doubt one of the greatest orators in this country, he is a towering figure on the left of British politics". Galloway's presence at the rally prompted some of those present to leave. Labour MP Kate Hoey, who was involved with GO, defended Galloway's participation. "George ended up getting a hugely favourable response to what he said". Responding to criticism of his association with Farage, Galloway tweeted: "We are not pals. We are allies in one cause. Like Churchill and Stalin".

On 17 April 2019 Galloway announced he would support the Brexit Party led by Nigel Farage in the May 2019 European Parliament election. In an announcement on Twitter, he said that "given the nature of Labour's Euro-fanatic candidates list and the crucial juncture we have reached in the fight for the full implementation of the Brexit referendum result and for one-time only I will be supporting Nigel Farage in next months elections."

Television presenter
In August 2009, editions of Galloway's programmes The Real Deal and Comment programme for Press TV, a London-based news channel controlled by the government of Iran, were found by the British broadcasting regulator Ofcom to have breached its broadcasting code on impartiality.

After Press TV lost its Ofcom licence in 2012, according to Galloway, the Iranian broadcaster owed him £40,000, leading to his company Miranda Media entering compulsory liquidation in 2013 because of unpaid tax. Reportedly, the owed payment amounts to £100,000, although Galloway disputed this in February 2016. Miranda Media, in which income from Galloway's media work was deposited, was established in September 2007 under a month before a law came into force allowing directors to receive loans from their own companies, a facility Galloway used on multiple occasions.

Shortly after its foundation in June 2012, Galloway became a presenter with the Al Mayadeen television station where he presents "Kalima Hurra" ( meaning free word). Al Mayadeen reportedly has connections with Iran and the Assad government in Syria, and has been accused of supporting the Assad government, a claim Galloway has rejected.

In November 2013, Galloway and his wife Gayatri began to present Sputnik for the RT network, a Russian government-backed station formerly known as Russia Today. He is a regular contributor to RT's other programming. Among the notable guests on Galloway's RT programmes have been Gilad Atzmon, and Shlomo Sand.

In an overview of the broadcasting organisations Galloway works for, Tom Rogan in the National Review in April 2014 described him as being "a Western puppet for tyranny's propagandists". In the register of members' financial interests published at the end of January 2015, Galloway disclosed that he had earned £293,450 from his television broadcasting in the previous year and had received almost £70,000 in travelling expenses and hotel stays. For the period November 2013 to February 2015, Galloway was paid £100,000 for his appearances on RT, the highest payment to any British politician working for the channel.

Radio presenter
Galloway began to broadcast on talkRADIO (which launched in March 2016 as a sister station to Talksport) in June 2016. Amongst his many monologues, he said that if Scotland were to leave the UK and join the EU "it would not be a good thing for his fellow countrymen", and has condemned the BBC as a "national disgrace".

Concerning the Iraq War, he said he would not rest "until Tony Blair is brought to justice", and in 2019 announced plans to try and prosecute Alastair Campbell.

In June 2019, after Liverpool Football Club had defeated Tottenham Hotspur Football Club in the Champions League final, Galloway congratulated the people of Liverpool and tweeted "No #Israël flags on the Cup!". He said that this referred to a number of Tottenham fans who were flying the flag of Israel in the crowd, showing "an affiliation to a 'racist state'". Tottenham Hotspur accused Galloway of "blatant anti-Semitism" and talkRADIO sacked him saying the broadcaster "does not tolerate anti-Semitic views".

Personal life

Marriages and children
Galloway has been married four times.

In 1979, he married Elaine Fyffe, with whom he has a daughter, Lucy (born 1982). The couple separated in 1987 and divorced in 1999.

In 1994, Galloway married Amineh Abu-Zayyad, a biologist of Palestinian origin, in a non-legally binding Islamic ceremony; a legally binding civil ceremony followed in March 2000. Abu-Zayyad was granted a divorce in February 2009, after an estrangement of several years, on the grounds of "unreasonable behaviour"; her petition was not contested.

Galloway married Rima Husseini, his former researcher, in a non-legally binding Islamic ceremony in 2005. Galloway had two sons, Zein (born 2007) and Faris (born 2011), with Husseini, who is from Lebanon.

On 31 March 2012, he married his fourth wife, Dutch-Indonesian anthropologist Putri Gayatri Pertiwi, in Amsterdam. The initial event was followed by a traditional Javanese wedding ceremony in Sumatra and a civil marriage at the House of Commons in September 2012. Pertiwi works as a consultant for a Dutch research firm and as a co-presenter of Galloway's TV show Sputnik. The couple have three children: a son, Toren Mustaqim, born on 15 July 2014; a daughter, Orlá Dhien, born in 2017; and another daughter, Òban Amaria, born in August 2020.

Religion
Galloway has been outspoken in support of religious liberties. Though he has long stated that his religious beliefs are a private matter, Galloway was raised and still identifies as a Roman Catholic. In a 2013 interview, Galloway sparked controversy for saying as a Roman Catholic, he would not feel safe in an independent Scotland given the historically bigoted views harboured by many Scottish nationalists towards Catholics.

Galloway has hired Muslims to fill prominent positions on his staff. At a 2012 rally he said "We stand for justice and haqq" and "A Muslim is somebody who is not afraid of earthly power but who fears only the Judgment Day. I’m ready for that, I’m working for that and it's the only thing I fear." His last three wives were Muslims, each of whom he married in an Islamic ceremony. According to Jemima Khan, writing for the New Statesman in April 2012, Galloway converted to Islam around 2000; his shahadah was performed in Kilburn, London, in the presence of members of the Muslim Association of Great Britain. Khan claims that while Galloway has informed "those close to him", he chose not to disclose his conversion to the public. Galloway said that the shahadah had not taken place: "I have never attended any such ceremony in Kilburn, Karachi or Kathmandu. It is simply and categorically untrue." He went on to reiterate his position that religious beliefs are a "personal matter".

See also 
 The Killing$ of Tony Blair – George Galloway's documentary film released July 2016
 The Mother of All Talk Shows – phone-in programme presented by Galloway on Talksport between 2006 and 2010 and talkRADIO between 2016 and 2019

References

Further reading
 Author
 I'm Not the Only One (2004)
 Mr Galloway Goes to Washington (2005)
 Fidel Castro Handbook (2006), MQ Publications. 
 Respect: Documents of the Crisis (2008) with Salma Yaqoob and Alan Thornett
 Open Season: The Neil Lennon Story (2011) Miranda Media

 Biography
 David Morley Gorgeous George: The Life and Adventures of George Galloway, Politico's Publishing, 2007

External links

 
 
 George Galloway Contributor page, The Guardian website
 George Galloway Contributor page, The Independent website
 
 

 
1954 births
Living people
British anti-poverty advocates
Members of the Parliament of the United Kingdom for English constituencies
Members of the Parliament of the United Kingdom for Glasgow constituencies
People educated at Harris Academy
People from Lochee
Politicians from Dundee
Respect Party MPs
Leaders of the Respect Party
Scottish activists

British anti-war activists
Scottish social commentators
Scottish columnists
Scottish Labour MPs
Scottish people of Irish descent
Scottish political writers
Scottish radio personalities
Scottish socialists
Transport and General Workers' Union-sponsored MPs
UK MPs 1987–1992
UK MPs 1992–1997
UK MPs 1997–2001
UK MPs 2001–2005
UK MPs 2005–2010
UK MPs 2010–2015
United Nations Oil-for-Food scandal
Press TV people
Independent members of the House of Commons of the United Kingdom
Hillhead
Anti-Zionism in the United Kingdom
British Eurosceptics
Members of Parliament for Bradford West
Big Brother (British TV series) contestants
Scottish radio presenters
Politicians affected by a party expulsion process
British political party founders